SS Toledo was an American Passenger/Cargo ship that sank during a storm in Lake Michigan near Port Washington, Wisconsin, United States on 24 October 1856 with the loss of 39 to 79 lives.

Construction 
Toledo was built at the Benjamin Buhl Jones shipyard in Buffalo, New York, United States and completed in 1854. The ship was also equipped with a single mast and smokestack. She was constructed with a wooden hull.

1855 Incidents 
In August 1855, Toledo collided with the schooner White Cloud in Lake Huron with both ships suffering damage. That same year, she struck a pier in Cleveland Harbor, Ohio, United States and partially sank. She was raised and repaired, but her cargo of corn was ruined.

Sinking 
Toledo departed Port Washington, Wisconsin, United States harbor on 24 October 1856 for Milwaukee, Wisconsin, United States with either 41 or 81 passengers and crew and package freight onboard, when a violent storm began to form. The ship's crew decided to lower the anchor, but its chain got caught. Before her crew could free the anchor chain with axes, she ran aground near Port Washington. The storm rapidly broke up the ship, leading to the loss of all but two of its passengers and crew.

Wreck 
Immediately following the sinking, most of the ship's superstructure had been broken up into fragments and strewn across two miles (3.2 km) of the lake shore near Port Washington, sometimes the debris reached several feet high. The ship's hull had mostly sunk to the lakebed with some large pieces washing up on shore. The ship's boilers and engine were raised on 27 September 1857 and sent to Chicago, Illinois, United States. The anchor was recovered in 1900 along with some of the ship's rigging. Her salvaged anchor lies at the Port Washington Union Cemetery. On 2 August 1963, two scuba divers explored the wrecksite and recovered several artifacts. The condition of Toledo 's wreck is described as extremely broken up and scattered over a large area while it rests on the lakebed of Lake Michigan on top of sand, rocks and hard packed clay in 20 feet (6 m) of water. The wreck's debris field begins just two yards (1.8 m) of shore, and the ship's decking, left behind machinery, and smokestack are still intact.

References

1854 ships
Passenger ships of the United States
Passenger ships
Cargo ships of the United States
Ships built in the United States
Ships built in New York (state)
Ships built in Buffalo, New York
Maritime incidents in 1855
Maritime incidents in 1856
Shipwrecks in lakes
Lake Michigan
Steamships
Steamships of the United States
Shipwrecks of Lake Michigan